The 2005 Bridgestone Presents the Champ Car World Series Powered by Ford season was the 27th overall and the second season of the Champ Car World Series era of American open-wheel racing. It began on April 10, 2005 in Long Beach, California and ended on November 6 in Mexico City, Mexico after 13 races. The Bridgestone Presents the Champ Car World Series Powered by Ford Drivers' Champion was Sébastien Bourdais, his second consecutive championship. The Rookie of the Year was Timo Glock.

Drivers and teams
The 2.65 liter turbo V8 Ford-Cosworth XFE engine continued to be the exclusive power plant for the series. Bridgestone continued on as the exclusive series tire supplier as well. The two companies continued the marketing agreement that branded the series Bridgestone Presents the Champ Car World Series Powered by Ford. All teams ran the Lola B02/00 chassis after the 2002 bankruptcy of Reynard Motorsport prevented further development of their Reynard 02I, causing it to become uncompetitive against the Lola.

The following teams and drivers competed in the 2005 Champ Car season.

Team and driver changes
Similar to the 2003 and 2004 seasons, there were once again many changes for the 2005 season. 
 Last season's rookie of the year runner-up Justin Wilson teamed up with the 2004 rookie of the year A. J. Allmendinger at RuSPORT. 
 PKV Racing brought 2002 CART champion Cristiano da Matta back to the Champ Car series after he spent two years driving for Toyota in Formula One. 
 Rocketsports Racing began the year with Formula One driver Timo Glock and Ryan Hunter-Reay. 
 Mi-Jack Conquest Racing signed 2004 Toyota Atlantic rookie of the year Andrew Ranger. 
 Mario Domínguez moved to Forsythe Championship Racing after 3 seasons with HVM Racing. 
 Domínguez replaced Patrick Carpentier who moved over to the IRL with Cheever Racing. 
 Forsythe's third driver in 2004, Rodolfo Lavín, began the 2005 season on the sidelines. 
 Walker Racing became Team Australia after a sponsor partnership was formed with Australian businessman Craig Gore.  They ran Champ Car veteran Alex Tagliani and a rookie from Australia, Marcus Marshall. 
 Domínguez's former team, which renamed itself HVM Racing from Herdez Competition after the salsa company ended its title sponsorship, began the season with 2003 Formula 3000 champion Björn Wirdheim and Toyota Atlantic driver Ronnie Bremer.

Mid-season changes
 The Jensen MotorSport team only appeared at the opening race of the season with Fabrizio del Monte at the wheel of the #41 car.
 PKV Racing gave Mexican driver Jorge Goeters a one-off drive at the Monterrey race.
 Bruno Junqueira was injured in the 2005 Indianapolis 500 and was replaced in the Newman/Haas team by Oriol Servià who departed Dale Coyne Racing.  Servià was replaced by various drivers at Dale Coyne during the season - Michael Valiante in Portland, Tarso Marques in Cleveland, Ryan Dalziel in Toronto and Ronnie Bremer for the remainder of the season.  Coyne ran one car at Milwaukee, where Ricardo Sperafico drove the #19 car instead of his usual #11 car for that race.
 Alex Sperafico replaced Ronnie Bremer at HVM Racing for the races in Toronto and Edmonton, with Rodolfo Lavín taking over for the rest of the season.
 Björn Wirdheim did not complete the season with HVM Racing. Fabrizio del Monte joined the team for the Surfers Paradise round and was slated to drive at the finale in Mexico City but suffered a concussion in a crash in practice at the Autódromo Hermanos Rodríguez and was not medically cleared to race.
 Team Australia fielded a third car in Surfers Paradise and Mexico City. Will Power made his Champ Car debut with the team at Surfers Paradise. After Marcus Marshall was released from the team after the race at Surfers Paradise, Power took over his car.  In Mexico the team's third car was driven by 2005 Toyota Atlantic champion Charles Zwolsman Jr.
 2004 Star Mazda champion Michael McDowell replaced Ryan Hunter-Reay in the Rocketsports team for the final two races of the season.
 Cedric the Entertainer entered into a partnership with HVM Racing in October 2005.  The race team was rebranded CTE Racing-HVM from that point forward.
 CTE Racing-HVM gave Mexican driver Homero Richards a one-off drive at the race in Mexico City.

Season summary

Schedule 

 Oval/Speedway
 Dedicated road course
 Temporary street circuit

The initial 2005 schedule announced by Champ Car included 14 races, but only 13 races actually took place during the season. The 14th race was scheduled to take place at a newly constructed permanent road circuit in the city of Ansan, South Korea on October 16, the week before the race at Surfers Paradise.  The race was canceled in September when it was determined that the circuit was not ready to host the race.  It was the second year in a row that a race in Korea was canceled, as a street circuit race in the capital of Seoul was removed from the 2004 schedule.  A date at the Ansan circuit was placed on Champ Car's initial 2006 schedule but that race would never take place either.

Race results

Final driver standings

Nation's Cup
 Top result per race counts towards the Nation's Cup

Driver breakdown

References

See also
 2005 Toyota Atlantic Championship season
 2005 Indianapolis 500
 2005 IndyCar Series
 2005 Infiniti Pro Series season

Champ Car seasons
Champ Car
Champ Car
2005 in Champ Car
Champ Car